

Medieval times

Ajuuraan state
1580s Ajuran–Portuguese wars

Modern times

Italian East Africa

June 10, 1940 C.E. – November 27, 1941 C.E. World War II
June 10, 1940 C.E. – May 2, 1945 C.E. Mediterranean and Middle East theatre
June 10, 1940 C.E. – November 27, 1941 C.E. East African Campaign
August 3, 1940 C.E. – August 19, 1940 C.E. Italian conquest of British Somaliland

Somali Democratic Republic
July 13, 1977 C.E. – March 15, 1978 C.E. Ethio—Somali War
April 6, 1981 C.E. - May 18, 1991 C.E. Somaliland War of Independence
June 1982 C.E. – August 1982 C.E. Ethiopian–Somali Border War
January 26, 1991 C.E. – ongoing Somali Civil War
1986 C.E. – 1991 C.E. Somali Rebellion
December 9, 1992 C.E. – May 4, 1993 C.E. Unified Task Force
August 22, 1993 C.E. – October 13, 1993 C.E. Operation Gothic Serpent
October 3, 1993 C.E. – October 4, 1993 C.E. Battle of Mogadishu

Transitional Federal Government
January 26, 1991 C.E. – ongoing Somali Civil War
June 4, 2006 C.E. – December 20, 2006 C.E. Advance of the Islamic Courts Union
May 7, 2006 C.E. – July 11, 2006 C.E. Battle of Mogadishu
December 20, 2006 C.E. – January 30, 2009 C.E. War in Somalia

December 20, 2006 C.E. – December 26, 2006 C.E. Battle of Baidoa
December 23, 2006 C.E. – December 25, 2006 C.E. Battle of Bandiradley
December 24, 2006 C.E. – December 25, 2006 C.E. Battle of Beledweyne
December 27, 2006 C.E. Battle of Jowhar
December 28, 2006 C.E. Fall of Mogadishu
December 31, 2006 C.E. – January 1, 2007 C.E. Battle of Jilib
January 1, 2007 C.E. Fall of Kismayo
January 5, 2007 C.E. – January 12, 2007 C.E. Battle of Ras Kamboni
March 21, 2007 C.E. – April 26, 2007 C.E. Battle of Mogadishu
May 31, 2007 C.E. – June 3, 2007 C.E. Battle of Bargal
November 8, 2007 C.E. – November 16, 2007 C.E. Battle of Mogadishu
April 19, 2008 C.E. – April 20, 2008 C.E. Battle of Mogadishu
July 1, 2008 C.E. – July 26, 2008 C.E. Battle of Beledweyne
July 8, 2008 C.E. – January 26, 2009 C.E. Siege of Baidoa
August 20, 2008 C.E. – August 22, 2008 C.E. Battle of Kismayo
Piracy in Somalia

March 18, 2006 C.E. Action
June 3, 2007 C.E. Action
December 8, 2008 C.E. – ongoing Operation Atalanta
September 16, 2008 C.E. Carré d'As IV incident
April 9, 2009 C.E. Raid off Somalia
April 8, 2009 C.E. – April 12, 2009 C.E. Maersk Alabama hijacking
August 17, 2009 C.E. – ongoing Operation Ocean Shield
March 23, 2010 C.E. Action
March 30, 2010 C.E. Action
April 5, 2010 C.E. Action
May 6, 2010 C.E. MV Moscow University hijacking
January 18, 2011 C.E. – January 21, 2011 C.E. Operation Dawn of Gulf of Aden
January 20, 2011 C.E. Operation Dawn 9: Gulf of Aden
January 22, 2011 C.E. – January 26 2011 C.E. MV Beluga Nomination incident
June 16, 2011 C.E. – June 19, 2011 C.E. Operation Umeed-e-Nuh
January 12, 2012 C.E. Attack on Spanish oiler Patiño
January 31, 2009 C.E. – ongoing War in Somalia

February 22, 2009 C.E. African Union base bombings in Mogadishu
February 24, 2009 C.E. – February 25, 2009 C.E. Battle of South Mogadishu
May 7, 2009 C.E. – October 1, 2009 C.E. Battle of Mogadishu
May 11, 2009 C.E. – October 1, 2009 C.E. Battle for Central Somalia
June 5, 2009 C.E. Battle of Wabho
June 18, 2009 C.E. Beledweyne bombing
October 1, 2009 C.E. – October 7, 2009 C.E. Battle of Kismayo
January 10, 2010 C.E. – January 14, 2010 C.E. Battle of Beledweyne
May 2010 C.E. – July 2010 C.E. Ayn clashes
May 1, 2010 C.E. Mogadishu bombings
July 20, 2010 C.E. Kenya–Al-Shabaab border clash
August 8, 2010 C.E. – October 17, 2010 C.E. Galgala campaign
August 23, 2010 C.E. — August 6, 2011 C.E. Battle of Mogadishu
April 27, 2011 C.E. Battle of Gedo
October 4, 2011 C.E. Mogadishu bombing
October 16, 2011 C.E. – June 2012 C.E. Operation Linda Nchi
September 28, 2012 C.E. – October 1, 2012 C.E. Battle of Kismayo
January 11, 2013 C.E. Bulo Marer hostage rescue attempt
1,995 C.E. – 2008 C.E. Insurgency in Ogaden
June 2,007 C.E. – May 2,008 C.E. Ethiopian crackdown in Ogaden

October 7, 2001 C.E. – ongoing War on Terrorism
October 7, 2002 C.E. – ongoing Operation Enduring Freedom – Horn of Africa
March 18, 2006 C.E. Action
January 5, 2007 C.E. – January 12, 2,007 C.E. Battle of Ras Kamboni
June 3, 2007 C.E. Action
May 31, 2007 C.E. – June 3, 2007 C.E. Battle of Bargal
March 3, 2008 C.E. Dobley airstrike
May 1, 2008 C.E. Dhusamareb airstrike
April 8, 2009 C.E. – April 12, 2009 C.E. Maersk Alabama hijacking
August 17, 2009 C.E. – present Operation Ocean Shield
September 14, 2009 C.E. Baraawe raid
January 25, 2012 C.E. Rescue of Jessica Buchanan and Poul Hagen Thisted

Federal Republic of Somalia

October 7, 2001 C.E. – ongoing War on Terrorism
October 7, 2002 C.E. – ongoing Operation Enduring Freedom – Horn of Africa
January 11, 2013 C.E. Bulo Marer hostage rescue attempt

See also
Somali Armed Forces
Somali Air Force
Somali Navy
Military history of Africa
African military systems to 1,800 C.E.
African military systems 1,800 C.E. — 1,900 C.E.
African military systems after 1,900 C.E.

Somalia history-related lists
Conflicts
Military history of Somalia